The Sentul Link is a major highway in Kuala Lumpur city, Malaysia. This highway is maintained by the Kuala Lumpur City Hall or Dewan Bandaraya Kuala Lumpur (DBKL).

History
The Sentul Link connects the PWTC interchange of Jalan Kuching to Lebuhraya Mahameru to Sentul. Construction began in 2004 and was completed in mid-2006. The projects led by Kuala Lumpur City Hall (Dewan Bandaraya Kuala Lumpur (DBKL)). The Sentul Link was opened to traffic on 20 July 2006.

List of interchange

Highways in Malaysia
Expressways and highways in the Klang Valley
Roads in Kuala Lumpur

References